Stephanie Diane Shaver (born 1975) is an American fantasy writer and video game developer.

She sold her first professional short story to Marion Zimmer Bradley's Sword and Sorceress series when she was 13. Her work has also been featured in various Valdemar anthologies, edited by Mercedes Lackey.

She is an active member of Science Fiction and Fantasy Writers of America (SFWA) and has also been a member of the Authors Guild. She gives talks about being a professional writer at fan conventions such as Dragon*Con and Archon. She worked for over a year at Marion Zimmer Bradley's Fantasy Magazine, and worked on two "Fantasy Worlds" Festivals as part of the committee and the program book editor.

In 2009, Shaver moved from St. Louis, Missouri to California. In St. Louis, she had worked as a game designer for Simutronics, serving as lead designer on Hero's Journey and contributing to DragonRealms.

Works

Valdemar 
 "Blood Ties" – Sword of Ice and Other Tales of Valdemar, 1997, Mercedes Lackey (ed.) 
 "Starhaven" – Sun in Glory and Other Tales of Valdemar, 2003, Mercedes Lackey (ed.) 
 "Safe and Sound" – Crossroads and Other Tales of Valdemar, 2005, Mercedes Lackey (ed.) 
 "Midwinter Gifts" – Changing the World: All-New Tales of Valdemar 2009, Mercedes Lackey (ed.)

Other stories 
 "At the Tolling of Midnight" – Sword and Sorceress VII, 1990, Marion Zimmer Bradley (ed.) 
 "Shards of Crystal" – Sword and Sorceress VIII, 1991, Marion Zimmer Bradley (ed.) 
 "Winterwood" – Sword & Sorceress IX, 1993, Marion Zimmer Bradley (ed.)
 "Her Mother's Sword" – Sword & Sorceress X, 1993, Marion Zimmer Bradley (ed.)
 "Ancient Warrior" – Sword & Sorceress XI, 1994, Marion Zimmer Bradley (ed.) 1994
 "Promise to Angel" – Sword & Sorceress XII, 1995, Marion Zimmer Bradley (ed.)
 "Circle of Ashes" – Lammas Night, 1996, Mercedes Lackey, ed. 
 "Jewel-Bright" – Sword & Sorceress XIII, 1996, Marion Zimmer Bradley (ed.)
 "Empty Jar, Empty Chest" – 100 Wicked Witch Stories, 2003, Stefan R. Dziemianowicz, Robert A. Weinberg & Martin H. Greenberg (ed.) 
 "Broken Bones" – Moving Targets, 2008, Mercedes Lackey (ed.)

References

External links
 Shaver's official website
 
 Internet Book List

20th-century American short story writers
21st-century American short story writers
American fantasy writers
American women short story writers
American video game designers
1975 births
Living people
MUD developers
Women science fiction and fantasy writers
Women video game developers
20th-century American women writers
21st-century American women writers